Time & Society is a peer-reviewed academic journal that publishes papers across a range of disciplines including sociology, anthropology, geography, history, and psychology. The current editors-in-chief are Michelle Bastian (University of Edinburgh) and Helge Jordheim (University of Oslo), and. It was established in 1992, with its founding editor being Barbara Adam. It is published by SAGE Publications.

Abstracting and indexing 
Time & Society is abstracted and indexed in Scopus and the Social Sciences Citation Index. According to the Journal Citation Reports, its 2021 impact factor is 1.891.

References

External links 
 

SAGE Publishing academic journals
English-language journals
Quarterly journals
Publications established in 1992
Sociology journals